In mathematics, a Böhmer integral is an integral introduced by  generalizing the Fresnel integrals.

There are two versions, given by 

Consequently, Fresnel integrals can be expressed in terms of the Böhmer integrals as

The sine integral and cosine integral can also be expressed in terms of the Böhmer integrals

References

Special functions